That Tennessee Beat is a 1966 American drama film directed by Richard Brill and written by Paul Schneider. The film stars Earl 'Snake' Richards, Sharon DeBord, Lightnin' Chance, Maurice Dembsky, Pete Drake and Dolores Faith.

The film was released on October 14, 1966, by 20th Century Fox.

The film marked Robert L. Lippert's return to filmmaking after a brief break. It was called Country Music.

Plot
Jim Birdsell, hoping to become a country-western star, steals money for a trip to Nashville. He is robbed on the way and is left penniless again. He is taken in by a brother/sister singing group who take him in, and help him fulfill his dream.

Cast   
Earl 'Snake' Richards as Jim Birdsell
Sharon DeBord as Opal Nelson
Lightnin' Chance as Sheriff
Stoney Mountain Cloggers as Themselves
Maurice Dembsky as Doorman
Pete Drake as Himself
Dolores Faith as Belle Scofield
Rink Hardin as Wally Cooper
Ernie Keller as Announcer
Ed Livingston as Hoodlum
Buddy Mize as Hoodlum Leader
Minnie Pearl as Rev. Rose Conley
Boots Randolph as Himself
Cecil Scaiffe as Dan Birdsell
The Statler Brothers as Themselves
Sam Tarpley as Ticket Seller
Merle Travis as Larry Scofield

References

External links 
 

1966 films
American drama films
1966 drama films
20th Century Fox films
1960s English-language films
1960s American films